Jump Around is the second extended play (EP) by British YouTuber and rapper KSI. It was released for digital download and streaming by Island Records and Universal Music Group on 28 October 2016. The EP features guest appearances from Stefflon Don, Waka Flocka Flame, MNDM, Mista Silva and Arjun. The EP was preceded by the singles "Goes Off", "Friends with Benefits", and "Jump Around". Simultaneous with the EP's release, KSI embarked on a European concert tour to promote the EP.

Promotion and release 
Jump Around was released for digital download and streaming by Island Records and Universal Music Group on 28 October 2016.

Singles 
"Goes Off", featuring British-Ghanaian artist Mista Silva, was released as the lead single from the EP on 29 April 2016. A music video, comprising footage of KSI's fanbase, was released one day later. It has received four million views.

"Friends with Benefits", with Dutch record production trio MNDM, was released as the second single from the EP on 29 July 2016. The song charted at number 69 on the UK Singles Chart and number 12 on the UK Hip Hop and R&B Singles Chart. An accompanying music video was released on 5 August 2016. The video stars KSI alongside his no-strings-attached ladyfriend in a series of silly vignettes which show the pair dressing up as various characters in reference to the song's lyrics. The video has received almost 50 million views.

"Jump Around", featuring American rapper Waka Flocka Flame, was released as the EP's third and final single on 16 September 2016. An accompanying music video was released on 3 October 2016. The video stars KSI and Waka Flocka Flame among a crowd of people, taking to the streets to cause carnage, jumping around and dancing. The video has received 14 million views.

"Touch Down", featuring British rapper Stefflon Don, appeared on the soundtrack of the film Baywatch (2017).

Tour 
On 5 July 2016, it was announced that KSI would embark on a 10-date concert tour across Europe to promote the Jump Around EP.

Track listing

Credits and personnel 
Credits adapted from Tidal.

 KSIsongwriting , vocals 
 DJ Turkishmixing , mastering , production , recording engineering , songwriting 
 Stefflon Donsongwriting , vocals 
 Zagorproduction , songwriting 
 Randolphsongwriting 
 Swayrecording engineering , production , songwriting , vocal arranging , additional vocals 
 Oscar Lo Bruttoediting 
 Waka Flocka Flamesongwriting , vocals 
 Charles Cookproduction , songwriting 
 David Appellsongwriting 
 Kal Mannsongwriting 
 Lawrence Muggerudsongwriting 
 MNDMproduction 
 Faried Jhauwproduction , songwriting , drums , recording engineering 
 Kris Coutinhosongwriting , drums , recording engineering 
 Rutti Cruiserecording engineering 
 Denise Kroesadditional vocals 
 Gia Re Lodge-O'Meallyadditional vocals 
 Mista Silvavocals 
 Andrew Mutambirakeyboard 
 Deecoproduction , songwriting 
 Arjunvocals 
 Levi Nihaproduction , songwriting 
 Rachel Calverleycello 
 Hirka Katarinaviola 
 Rachel Jenningsviolin 
 Rob Rossviolin 
 Dave Stanleyrecording engineering

Charts

Release history

References 

2016 EPs
KSI albums
Island Records EPs
Universal Music Group EPs